Rhigozum is a genus of flowering plants in the family Bignoniaceae.

Rhigozum is a flowering shrub or small tree which is native to the drier areas of Africa. It can grow to 3 metres in height. This genus is characterised by branches which are short, rigid and twisting in angular directions. This genus produces flowers between the months of September and December. It is native to the dry, open woodlands and rocky outcrops of Angola, Botswana, Namibia, South Africa, Zambia, and Zimbabwe.

Species
 Rhigozum brevispinosum Kuntze
 Rhigozum madagascariense Drake
 Rhigozum obovatum Burch.
 Rhigozum somalense Hallier f.
 Rhigozum trichotum Burch.
 Rhigozum trichotomum Burch.
 Rhigozum virgatum Merxm. & A.Schreib.
 Rhigozum zambesiacum Baker

References

External links
The Plant List
Flora of Zimbabwe

Bignoniaceae
Bignoniaceae genera
Taxa named by William John Burchell